The secretary of state of Colorado is the secretary of state of the state of Colorado in the United States. The office is one of five elected constitutional offices in the state. The current secretary of state is Democrat Jena Griswold.

Structure
The Secretary of State heads the Colorado Department of State, a principal department of the Colorado state government, which is composed of four divisions:

Business & Licensing Division: Files documents for certain business organizations and business names; files trade names for certain business entities; registers trademarks, and files financing statements and notices of security interests in agricultural products pursuant to the Uniform Commercial Code, federal tax liens; and other miscellaneous statutory liens; performs searches of those records; provides copies of filed documents; issues related certificates; and provides pertinent educational services. Issues bingo/raffle licenses and inspects facilities and operations of these games to ensure compliance with bingo/raffle laws; commissions and regulates notaries public; registers charitable organizations that solicit contributions in Colorado and their professional fundraisers; publishes the Colorado administrative rules code and register, and provides rulemaking guidance for state agencies.
Elections Division: Supervises elections, maintains the statewide voter registration file, verifies initiative petition signatures, and administers the campaign finance laws; and serves as the filing office for unincorporated communities and for conflict of interest disclosure statements.
Administration Division: Provides management and central support services for the Department of State such as budgeting, accounting, and human resources; monitors the use of the state seal, certifies the interest rate on appealed money judgments, files acts passed by the General Assembly, and conveys information within the office to the public; plans and monitors legislation that affects the Department of State; responds to inquiries from the press and public; licenses entities that circulate petitions; and registers lobbyists.
Information Technology Division: Supports the information systems needs of the entire secretary of state's office. Maintains the departmental infrastructure consisting of multiple servers, personal computers, networking equipment, firewall, telephony, peripherals, and other information technology equipment to support the data and imaging needs of the department. Also supports the web presence of the secretary of state.

List of secretaries of state of Colorado

References

External links
Official website

 
1861 establishments in Colorado Territory